Eupholus nickerli is a species of beetle belonging to the  family Curculionidae.

Subspecies
Subspecies include: 
Eupholus-nickerli cyanescens 
Eupholus-nickerli anthracina

Distribution
This species can be found in Papua New Guinea.

Habitat
These beetles mainly inhabit  warm forest.

Description

In the subspecies Eupholus-nickerli cyanescens the basic colour of these quite variable beetles is metallic blue, with some transversal irregular black bands along the elytra. The thorax is uniformly blue. In the subspecies Eupholus-nickerli anthracina  the basic color is greygreyish, with transversal black and yellowish bands . These structural colours derive from very small, flat scales  and possibly serve to warn predators of their toxicity. The top of rostrum and the end of the antennae are black.

References

External links
 World Field Guide
 Als Photo Page

Entiminae
Beetles described in 1913